Taxodium mucronatum, commonly known as Montezuma bald cypress, Montezuma cypress, or ahuehuete, is a species of Taxodium that is primarily native to Mexico and Guatemala, with a few populations in the southwestern United States.  Ahuehuete is derived from the Nahuatl name for the tree, āhuēhuētl, which means "upright drum in water" or "old man of the water."

Description
Unlike bald cypress and pond cypress, Montezuma cypress rarely produces cypress knees from the roots. Trees from the Mexican highlands achieve a notable stoutness.

Several other specimens from  diameter are known. The second stoutest tree in the world is the Big Baobab, an African baobab.

Distribution and habitat

Montezuma cypress is primarily a riparian tree, growing along upland riversides, but can also be found next to springs and marshes. T. mucronatum is very drought-tolerant and fast-growing and favors climates that are rainy throughout the year or at least with high summer rainfall.

Taxodium mucronatum is native to much of Mexico as far south as the highlands of southern Mexico. Two disjunct populations exist in the United States.  One is in the Rio Grande Valley of southernmost Texas, while the other is in southern New Mexico, near Las Cruces. Within Guatemala, the tree is restricted to Huehuetenango Department.

Culture

The sabino became the national tree of Mexico in 1910. The tree is sacred to the native peoples of Mexico, and is featured in the Zapotec creation myth. To the Aztecs, the combined shade of an āhuēhuētl and a pōchōtl (Ceiba pentandra) metaphorically represented a ruler's authority.  According to legend, Hernán Cortés wept under an ahuehuete in Popotla after suffering defeat during the Battle of La Noche Triste.

This plant is mentioned in the 2015 short story "Rivers" by John Keene, which reimagines the story of Mark Twain's Adventures of Huckleberry Finn.

Uses

Montezuma cypresses have been used as ornamental trees since Pre-Columbian times. The Aztecs planted āhuēhuētl along processional paths in the gardens of Chapultepec because of its association with government. Artificial islands called chinampas were formed in the shallow lakes of the Valley of Mexico by adding soil to rectangular areas enclosed by trees such as āhuēhuētl; they also lined the region's canals prior to Spanish conquest.

Ahuehuetes are frequently cultivated in Mexican parks and gardens.  The wood is used to make house beams and furniture,. The Aztecs used its resin to treat gout, ulcers, skin diseases, wounds, and toothaches.  A decoction made from the bark was used as a diuretic and an emmenagogue. Pitch derived from the wood was used as a cure for bronchitis The leaves acted as a relaxant and could help reduce itching. In some parts of Mexico the foliage is used to decorate church altars during religious ceremonies.

John Naka, a world-renowned bonsai master, donated his very first bonsai, a Montezuma cypress, to the National Bonsai and Penjing Museum of the United States. 

A linear grove is located in the main courtyard of the Getty Center Art Museum, thriving since 1995.

Hybrids
Taxodium × ‘LaNana’ (T. distichum × T. mucronatum)
Taxodium 'Zhongshansa' (T. distichum × T. mucronatum)

References

General references
Eguiluz T. 1982. Clima y Distribución del género pinus en México. Distrito Federal. Mexico.
Rzedowski J. 1983. Vegetación de México. Distrito Federal, Mexico.
Martínez, Maximinio. 1978. Catálogo de nombres vulgares y científicos de plantas mexicanas.

External links

mucronatum
Trees of Mexico
Trees of Guatemala
Flora of Texas
Plants described in 1853
National symbols of Mexico
Ornamental trees
Garden plants of North America
Drought-tolerant trees
Trees of temperate climates
Flora of the Sierra Madre Occidental
Flora of the Sierra Madre Oriental
Flora of the Trans-Mexican Volcanic Belt